G. Devaraya Naik (c. 1947 – 12 July 2017) was an Indian politician.

Naik was born in Siddapur taluk, Gavinagudda village. He was elected as the MP to the Indian Parliament from Uttara Kannada (Canara) Constituency from Congress four times in 1980, 1984, 1989, and 1991.

See also
 Uttara Kannada

References

Year of birth uncertain
1940s births
2017 deaths
Indian National Congress politicians from Karnataka
People from Uttara Kannada
India MPs 1980–1984
India MPs 1984–1989
India MPs 1989–1991
India MPs 1991–1996
Lok Sabha members from Karnataka